A headband is a topless headgear.

Headband may also refer to:
 Headband (band), a 1970s Australian band formed by Peter Head
 "Headband" (song), a song by B.o.B.
 "The Headband", an episode of the television series Avatar: The Last Airbender
 Endband, a part of a bound book
 "Head Band" (Dexter's Laboratory), a 2003 episode

See also 
 Shiva's Headband, an early Texas psychedelic rock band, formed in Austin in 1967
 Tonto's Expanding Head Band, an electronic music duo consisting of Malcolm Cecil and Robert Margouleff